Holospira is a genus of air-breathing land snails, terrestrial pulmonate gastropod molluscs in the family Urocoptidae.

Holospira is the type genus of the subfamily 'Holospirinae Pilsbry, 1946'.

Etymology 
Holos (ὅλος) from Ancient Greek means "‘whole’" or "‘entire’" and spira (spīra) from Latin means spire.

Shell description 
The shell is small, cylindric, terminating above in a conic spire, retaining all the whorls, rimate or perforate. The shell has 11-21 whorls, which are closely coiled. The first 1½ of whorls are smooth. The rest of whorls are smooth, striate or ribbed. The suture is superficial. Body whorl is more or less built forward.

The aperture is small, obliquely pear-shaped, rounded or oval. The peristome is expanded or reflected, continuous and usually free throughout.

The columella (internal column) is hollow, variously sculptured or smooth.

Anatomy 

The foot is small, narrow for its length.

The lung is long and narrow. Kidney is very narrowly triangular, being wider at the base, tapering anteriorly, slightly longer than the pericardium. There is apparently no secondary ureter.

The buccal mass is small, about twice as long as wide, the oesophagus opening well forward. Salivary glands are not united, and in Holospira goldfussi they have long ducts.

The jaw is thin, arcuate, with a wide median projection below or none. The radula is about four times as long as wide, with from 19.1.19 teeth (in Holospira pilsbryi) to 27.1.27 (in Holopsira nelsoni).

The genital system is like this: there is an atrium of moderate length, the penis is short, with a very long vas deferens, the retractor muscle (p. r.) being inserted at or just beyond the slightly swollen penis, and proximally attached to the floor of the lung, as usual.

The free retractor muscles, attached proximally to the axis at about the junction of the cone with the cylindrical portion of the shell, are excessively long.

Distribution 
The geographic range of this genus extends from southern Mexico to Texas, Arizona and New Mexico. These snails are not found in Lower California nor Guatemala on the southeast.

Habitat 
They are confined chiefly to the elevated plateau, where they live under cacti, etc., in sunny places.

These snails can tolerate great heat.

Henry Augustus Pilsbry (1903) states, that living specimens of Holospira strobeliana and Holospira nelsoni survived immersion in boiling water for some minutes. Unlike other snails, they did not retract in the water.

Species 
Species in the genus Holospira include:
 Holospira acanthidia
 Holospira aguerreverei
 Holospira albertoi
 Holospira alvarezensis
 Holospira animasensis Gilbertson & Worthington, 2003 from subgenus Eudistemma
 Holospira arizonensis Stearns, 1890 - Arizona holospira
 Holospira aurantiaca
 Holospira bilamellata Dall, 1895 - bilamellate holospira
 Holospira bostrichocentrum
 Holospira campestris Pilsbry & Ferriss, 1915
 Holospira campo
 Holospira chazumbae
 Holospira chiricahuana Pilsbry, 1905 - Cave Creek holospira
 Holospira cionella Pilsbry, 1905
 Holospira cockerelli Dall, 1897 - Cockerell holospira
 Holospira colymis
 Holospira cremnobates
 Holospira crossei Dall, 1895 - Cross holospira
 Holospira dalli Pilsbry
 Holospira danielsi Pilsbry & Ferriss, 1915 - strongrib holospira
 Holospira denserpens
 Holospira dentaxis
 Holospira durangoensis
 Holospira eburnea
 Holospira elizabethae Pilsbry, 1889
 Holospira fergusoni Gilbertson & Naranjo-García, 2010
 Holospira ferrissi Pilsbry, 1905 - stocky holospira
 Holospira fortisculpta
 Holospira goldfussi (Menke, 1847) - New Braunfels holospira
 Holospira goldfussi anacachensis Bartsch
 Holospira goldmani
 † Holospira grangeri Cockerell - fossil species from Eocene of New Mexico known only from type locality
 Holospira haasai
 Holospira hamiltoni Dall, 1897 - Hamilton holospira
 Holospira haploplax
 Holospira hinckleyi
 Holospira hinkleyi
 Holospira hoffmani
 Holospira hogeana
 Holospira hyperia
 Holospira insolata
 † Holospira leidyi (Meek) - synonym Pupa leidyi Meek - fossil species from Eocene of New Mexico
 Holospira mariae
 Holospira marmorata
 Holospira maxwelli
 Holospira mesolia Pilsbry, 1912 - widemouth holospira
 Holospira metcalfi F. G. Thompson, 1974 - Metcalf holospira
 Holospira milleri
 Holospira millestriata Pilsbry & Ferriss, 1915
 Holospira millistriata
 Holospira minima
 Holospira montivaga Pilsbry, 1946 - vagabond holospira
 Holospira morelosensis
 Holospira nelsoni
 Holospira odontoplax
 Holospira orcutti
 Holospira oritis Pilsbry & Cheatum, 1951 - mountain holospira
 Holospira palmeri
 Holospira pasonis Dall, 1895 - robust holospira
 Holospira pedroana
 Holospira pfeifferi
 Holospira pilocerei Pfr. - type species
 Holospira pilsbryi
 Holospira pityis Pilsbry & Cheatum, 1951 - pinecone holospira
 Holospira psectra
 Holospira pupa
 Holospira regis Pilsbry & Cockerell, 1905 - royal holospira
 Holospira rehderi
 Holospira remondii
 Holospira rhinion
 Holospira riograndensis Pilsbry, 1946 - Rio Grande holospira
 Holospira saltillensis
 Holospira scololaema
 Holospira sherbrookei Gilbertson, 1989 - Silver Creek holospira
 Holospira stalactella
 Holospira stenopylis
 Holospira stenopyus
 Holospira tantalus Bartsch, 1906 - teasing holospira
 Holospira temeroso
 Holospira teotitlana
 Holospira tryoni
 Holospira whetstonensis Pilsbry & Ferriss, 1923 - Whetstone holospira
 Holospira wilmotti
 Holospira yucatanensis Bartsch, 1906 - Bartsch holospira
 Holospira zygoptyx

References
This article incorporates public domain text from reference.

Further reading 
 Pilsbry H. A. (6 December) 1946. Land Mollusca of North America (north of Mexico), vol. II(1): 103, 111.

External links 
 Tony Gallucci & James F. Scudday. 1979. Holospira Mesolia (Urocoptidae) New to Brewster County, Texas. The Southwestern Naturalist, 24(4): page 691.

Urocoptidae